"Candlelight" is a song by the band The Maccabeats that was released in November 2010. It achieved viral status. The song is a transformation of Mike Tompkins's a cappella cover of the Taio Cruz song "Dynamite" to lyrics about the holiday of Hanukkah. The Maccabeats are an all-male Jewish a cappella student group that formed at Yeshiva University.

The lyrics were written by Immanuel Shalev and David Block; Uri Westrich, a medical student and alumnus, made the video.

The song reached #1 on Billboard magazine's Comedy Digital Tracks chart in December 2010.

This song led to many more Hanukkah parody and cover music videos being made by Jewish music groups.

References

External links
 

2010 songs
Hanukkah music
Holiday songs
Viral videos
Yeshiva University